"Mi Corazoncito" is Aventura's second single from their second live album K.O.B. Live (2006). The song reached big recognition in many Spanish-speaking countries and reached number two on the Billboard Hot Latin Tracks chart.

Music video
The music video for "Mi Corazoncito" shows Romeo looking at a picture of a girl he is in love with and he is imagining that she is in love with him, while in reality, she keeps pushing him away. In the end, they end up being in love with each other.

Charts

Weekly charts

Year-end charts

Awards
"Mi Corazoncito" received two awards  in the 2008 Latin Billboard Music Awards for "Hot Latin Song of the Year" and "Tropical Airplay Song of the Year" by a Duo or Group. The song also received an award at the Premio Lo Nuestro 2008 for "Tropical Song of the Year".

References

2007 singles
Aventura (band) songs
Spanish-language songs
2006 songs
Songs written by Romeo Santos